The 22nd Daytime Emmy Awards were that were held on May 19, 1995 on NBC to commemorate excellence in daytime programming from the previous year (1994). The nominees were announced on March 29, 1995. Winners are in bold.

Outstanding Drama Series 
All My Children
Days of Our Lives
General Hospital
The Young and the Restless

Outstanding Lead Actor 
Peter Bergman (Jack Abbott, The Young and the Restless)
David Canary (Adam Chandler/Stuart Chandler, All My Children)
Justin Deas (Buzz Cooper, Guiding Light)
Brad Maule (Tony Jones, General Hospital)
Michael Zaslow (Roger Thorpe, Guiding Light)

Outstanding Lead Actress 
Leslie Charleson (Monica Quartermaine, General Hospital)
Marj Dusay (Alexandra Spaulding, Guiding Light)
Maeve Kinkead (Vanessa Chamberlain, Guiding Light)
Susan Lucci (Erica Kane, All My Children)
Erika Slezak (Victoria Lord, One Life to Live)

Outstanding Supporting Actor 
Keith Hamilton Cobb (Noah Keefer, All My Children)
Ian Buchanan (James Warwick, The Bold and the Beautiful)
Rick Hearst (Alan-Michael Spaulding, Guiding Light)
Roger Howarth (Todd Manning, One Life to Live)
Jerry verDorn (Ross Marler, Guiding Light)

Outstanding Supporting Actress 
Jean Carol (Nadine Corley, Guiding Light)
Melina Kanakaredes (Eleni Andros, Guiding Light)
Sydney Penny (Julia Santos, All My Children)
Rena Sofer (Lois Cerullo, General Hospital)
Jacklyn Zeman (Bobbie Spencer, General Hospital)

Outstanding Younger Actor 

Jason Biggs (Pete Wendall, As the World Turns)
Bryan Buffington (Bill Lewis, Guiding Light)
Jonathan Jackson (Lucky Spencer, General Hospital)
Tommy J. Michaels (Tim Dillon, All My Children)

Outstanding Younger Actress 

Sarah Michelle Gellar (Kendall Hart, All My Children)
Kimberly McCullough (Robin Scorpio, General Hospital)
Rachel Miner (Michelle Bauer, Guiding Light)
Heather Tom (Victoria Newman, The Young and the Restless)

Outstanding Drama Series Writing Team 

All My Children
General Hospital
One Life to Live
The Young and the Restless

Outstanding Drama Series Directing Team 

All My Children
Another World
As the World Turns
One Life to Live
The Young and the Restless

Outstanding Game/Audience Participation Show 

Jeopardy! (Columbia TriStar Television/KingWorld)
American Gladiators (Four Point Entertainment/Samuel Goldwyn TV)
Fourth Annual Rock N' Jock B-Ball Jam
The Price Is Right (Mark Goodson Productions/All American Television/Paramount Television/CBS)
Wheel of Fortune (Columbia TriStar Television/KingWorld)

Outstanding Game Show Host 

Bob Barker (The Price Is Right)
Alex Trebek (Jeopardy!)

Outstanding Costume Design 

Lois DeArmond (Adventures in Wonderland)
 Ann Marie Holdgruen, Laurent Linn, Carlo Yannuzzi, Larry Jameson, Mark Ruffin, Terry Roberson, Stephen Rotondaro, Edward G. Christie, Rollin Krewson, William Kellard, Mark Zeszotek, Connie Peterson, Peter MacKennan, Fred Buchholz, Goran Sparrman, and Tom Newby (Sesame Street)
Danajean Cicerchi (Where in the World Is Carmen Sandiego?)
Lois DeArmond, and Betsey Potter (Beakman's World)
Doug Enderle (Walt Disney World Very Merry Christmas Parade)
 Charles Chiodo, Stephen Chiodo, and Edward Chiodo (ABC Weekend Specials - "Crash the Curiousaurus")

Outstanding Children's Series 

Linda Ellerbee, Rolfe Tessem, Murr LeBay, Bob Brienza, and Mark Lyons (Nick News with Linda Ellerbee)
 James McKenna, Hamilton McCulloch, Erren Gottlieb, and Elizabeth Brock (Bill Nye, the Science Guy)
Robert Heath, and Mark Waxman (Beakman's World)
Ed Wiseman, Cecily Truett, Larry Lancit, Stacey Raider, Orly Berger, Twila Liggett, Tony Buttino, LeVar Burton, and Jill Gluckson  (Reading Rainbow)
 Jay Rayvid, Lynn Kestinn-Sessler, Kate Taylor, Howard Lee, Howard J. Blumenthal, and Jonathan G. Meath (Where in the World Is Carmen Sandiego?)

Outstanding Film Sound Mixing 

Timothy J. Garrity, Timothy Borquez, Jim Hodson, Bill Koepnick, Melissa Ellis and Deb Adair (Aladdin)
Thomas Orsi and Don Summer (ABC Afterschool Specials:Boys Will Be Boys)
Timothy J. Borquez and Timothy J. Garrity (The Little Mermaid)
David John West, John Boyd and Todd Orr (The Tick)
John Asman, Walt Martin, David E. Fluhr and Sam Black (Trick of the Eye)
David John West, Kevin Patrick Burns, Todd Orr and John Boyd (Exosquad)

Outstanding Film Sound Editing 

Alex Wilkinson, Charles Rychwalski, William Griggs, Kenneth Young, Melissa Ellis, Bill Koepnick, Greg LaPlante, Jennifer Mertens, Ray Leonard, Michael Geisler, John O. Robinson III, Marc S. Perlman Michael Gollom, Jim Hodson, Timothy J. Borquez, Phyllis Ginter, Robert Duran and Tom Jaeger (Aladdin)
Brian F. Mars, Charles Rychwalski, Michael Geisler, John O. Robinson III, Jennifer Mertens, Tom Jaeger and Greg LaPlante (The Little Mermaid)
David John West, Matthew West, Chris Fradkin, Rick Hinson, Mark Cleary and Susan Welsh (Exosquad)
Mark Cleary, Chris Fradkin, Rick Hinson and David John West (The Tick)
Matt Thorne, John Hegedes, Tom Maydeck, Robert Hargreaves, Russell Brower, Mark Keatts, J.J. George, Mike Dickeson and Daryl B. Kell (Batman: The Animated Series)

Outstanding Music Direction and Composition 

Mark Watters, John Given, Harvey Cohen, Carl Johnson and Thomas Richard Sharp (Aladdin)
Jeff Moss, Christopher Cerf, Tony Geiss, Gail Sky King, Robby Merkin, Stephen Lawrence, Sarah Durkee, Dave Conner and Paul Jacobs (Sesame Street)
Don Sebesky (Allegra's Window)
Shirley Walker (Batman: The Animated Series)
Steven Bernstein and Richard Stone (Animaniacs)

Outstanding in Animation 

Peter Gaffney, Jonathan Greenberg, Rachel Lipman, Paul Germain, Steve Socki, Howard E. Baker and Jim Duffy (Rugrats)
Robert Renzetti, Todd Frederiksen, Mark Saraceni, Tony Craig and Miles Thompson (2 Stupid Dogs)
Derdad Aghamalian, Ed Klautky, Craig Wilson, Sung Hwan Choi, Rae McCarson, Ted Blackman, Leonard Robledo, Rick Del Carmen, Richard Ziehler-Martin, Alex Stevens, Fedja Jovanovic, Bill Sienkiewicz, Joseph Dempsey, Kent Butterworth, Lin Zeng, Tom Nesbitt, Ray Shenusay, Sean Roche, Neil Hunter, John Schaeffer, Chuck Puntuvatana, Felipe Morell, Teri Shikasho, Doug Molitor, Eufronio R. Cruz, Keith Weesner, Moe Green, Hector Martinez, Fernando Tenedora and Junn Roca (Where on Earth Is Carmen Sandiego?)
Chris Battle, Jeff W. Smith, Cathy Malkasian, Igor Kovalyov, John Holmquist, Debbie Baber, Vadim Medzhibovskiy, Rumen Petkov, Zhenia Delioussine, Stephen Lawes, Bradley J. Gake, Alex Dilts, Anita Ziobro, Peter Gaffney, Jim Duffy, Kelly James, Dan Krall, Toni Vian, Sergey Shramkosky, Marcy Rubin, Andrei Svislotski, Ron Campbell, Jerry Richardson, David Litt, David Silverman, Steve Ressel and Craig Simmons (Aaahh!!! Real Monsters)
Rich Arons, Barry Caldwell, Michael Gerard, Alfred Gimeno, Dave Marshall, Jon McClenahan, Rusty Mills, Audu Paden, Greg Reyna, Lenord Robinson, Andrea Romano, Peter Hastings, Nicholas Hollander, John P. McCann, Tom Minton, Deanna Oliver, Randy Rogel, Paul Rugg, Tom Ruegger and Sherri Stoner (Animaniacs)

Outstanding Performer In An Animated Program 

Lily Tomlin (Valerie Felicity Frizzle, The Magic School Bus)
Tim Curry (Skullmaster, Mighty Max)
Roscoe Lee Browne (Kingpin, Spider-Man: The Animated Series)
Rita Moreno (Carmen Sandiego, Where on Earth Is Carmen Sandiego?)
Ruby Dee (Grandmother, Whitewash)

Lifetime achievement award 

 Ted Corday
 Betty Corday

References

External links

022
Daytime Emmy Awards